"Night Window" is the first single by Canadian band Young Liars from their debut album, Tidal Wave. The song was released as single March 25. 2014, then as part of a promotional EP on April 29. 2014 featuring the next single" Young Again" and two remixes for both songs respectively. An official music video was released on June 2. 2014 directed by Nathan Boey. It was chosen as Vimeo Staff Pick soon after release and has had more than 100,000+ views.

Track listing

References

2014 singles
Young Liars (band) songs
2014 songs
Nettwerk Records singles